The flag of the Ba'ath Party is a tricolor of three equal horizontal stripes (black, white, and green from top to bottom) overlaid by a red triangle issuing from the hoist. These are the Pan-Arab colors.

It is similar to the Flag of Palestine, originating from the Flag of the Arab Revolt.

References

Arab nationalist symbols
Ba'ath Party
Ba'ath Party